The Regiment Stoottroepen Prins Bernhard is an infantry regiment of the Royal Netherlands Army.

The Regiment Stoottroepen was founded on 21 September 1944 in Eindhoven, and composed of members of the Dutch resistance from those parts of the Netherlands that had been recently liberated from German occupation. The formation took place on the orders of Prince Bernhard, in his capacity as Commander of the Dutch armed forces. By the time of the surrender of the last German forces in the Netherlands, on 5 May 1945, the regiment had grown to some 6,000 men.

Following the liberation of the Netherlands, the regiment was incorporated into the RNLA, and it component battalions took part in the police actions in the Dutch East Indies 1946–1949. During the 1950s, the Dutch army underwent reorganisation, and the Regiment Stoottropen was reduced to one battalion, 41 Infantry Battalion. In due course, this unit was converted to mechanized infantry (Dutch: pantserinfanteriebataljon, abbreviated to "painfbat").

In 1994, 41 Painfbat was deactivated, and the lineage and colours of the Regiment Stoottroepen were taken over by 13 Infantry Battalion and 11 Mortar Company, both of which form part of 11 Luchtmobiele (Airmobile) Brigade. Following the death of Prince Bernhard in 2004, the regiment was renamed "Regiment Stoottroepen Prins Bernhard" in his honour. In 2011 the Charlie Company took over the traditions of the ‘Margrietcompagnie’.

References

Military units and formations established in 1944
Stoottroepen Prins Bernhard